The 1956 Wyoming Cowboys football team was an American football team that represented the University of Wyoming as a member of the Skyline Conference during the 1956 NCAA University Division football season.  In their fourth season under head coach Phil Dickens, the Cowboys compiled a perfect 10–0 record (7–0 against Skyline opponents), won the Skyline Conference championship, and outscored opponents by a total of 252 to 112. The Cowboys were ranked No. 19 in the AP Poll issued on November 19, 1956, but dropped out in the final poll.

The team's statistical leaders included Larry Zowada with 878 passing yards, Jim Crawford with 1,104 rushing yards and 72 points scored, and John Watts with 287 receiving yards. Crawford led the nation in rushing yards and went on to play five seasons for the Boston Patriots.

Believing that they would get a better bowl appearance, the team declined a Sun Bowl invitation.  No other invitations came.

Schedule

References

Wyoming
Wyoming Cowboys football seasons
Mountain States Conference football champion seasons
College football undefeated seasons
Wyoming Cowboys football